Brian Moses (born 1950) is an English poet. He mainly writes for children, has over 200 published works and is a well known as a children's poet. His poetry books and anthologies for Macmillan have sold in excess of 1 million copies. Brian was asked by CBBC to write a poem for the Queen's 80th birthday.

Topics 

Brian’s interests range from the familiar – Deaths, football matches – to the peculiar – monsters, aliens and angels. Often he will mix the two together in his poetry, so the 'Shopping Trolley' is souped-up like a futuristic sports car, while the monsters still go to school before coming home on 'The Ghoul School Bus'. Brian draws some of his surreal moments from daily life – the man in Walking with my Iguana, who walks his pet potato on Hastings beach on a leash, is based on a real person.

Music 

Brian began writing poems when he decided against being a rock star – "I put the guitar to one side, but the songs carried on and became poems". That original musical influence can still be heard in his work; while he rarely sings, he performs so that pauses, tone of voice and speed become a central part of the poem, such as the hiss in 'The Snake Hotel' or the Tom Waits growl in 'Walking with my Iguana' which is in the top 3 most listened to poems in the Poetry Archive.

Pictures 

Brian writes and edits poetry and picture books for children, and resource books for teachers. His latest book for teachers is Able Writers in Your School (co-written with Roger Stevens), Brilliant Publications. His latest picture books are 'Beetle in the Bathroom' (Troika) and 'Animal Pants' (Macmillan). His latest books are "Lost Magic: The Very Best of Brian Moses"  (Macmillan 2016), "Keeping Clear of Paradise Street: A Seaside Childhood in the 1950s' (CandyJar Books, 2016), 'Dreamer' - Saving Our Wild World, (OtterBarry picture book, 2016) and '1066 & Before That: History Poems' - written with Roger Stevens (Macmillan, 2016). His first children's novel 'Python' is now published by CandyJar Books) A new book of poetry, 'I Thought I Heard a Tree Sneeze' was published by Troika in August 2018. Two picture books, both illustrated by Ed Boxall will be published in 2019 - 'Walking With My Iguana' and 'Dragons' Wood' (Both published by Troika Books)

Appreciation 

Brian was invited by HRH Prince Charles to speak at the Prince's Summer School for Teachers at Cambridge University in July 2007.  He was also one of 10 children's poets invited by the then Poet Laureate, Andrew Motion, to feature in a website as part of the National Poetry Archive - launched in November 2005. Address of site below. He is also founder & co-director of a national Able Writers' Scheme administered by Authors Abroad.

References

External links

Biography at Poetry Archive
Brian Moses' page on AuthorsAbroad.com School Author Visits
Brian Moses' book "Able Writers in Your School" from Brilliant Publications

Living people
1950 births
English male poets
Children's poets